Raymond Wallace Bolger (January 10, 1904 – January 15, 1987) was an American actor, dancer, singer, vaudevillian, and stage performer (particularly musical theater) who started his movie career in the silent-film era. 

Bolger was a major Broadway performer in the 1930s and beyond. He is best known for his roles in The Wizard of Oz (1939) as the Scarecrow and in Walt Disney's holiday musical fantasy Babes in Toyland in 1961 as the villainous Barnaby. 

Bolger was the host of The Ray Bolger Show on TV from 1953 to 1955, originally titled Where's Raymond?

Early life
Raymond Wallace Bolger was born at 598 Second St., South Boston, Massachusetts, into a Catholic family of Irish descent. He was the son of James Edward Bolger and Anne C. née Wallace. His father James was first-generation Irish, and was born in Fall River, Massachusetts; his mother "Annie" who had a large Irish family, was born in Bridgewater, Massachusetts. He grew up and attended school in the Codman Square section of Dorchester neighborhood of Boston. After graduating from high school, he worked for a peanut company, as a bank messenger, and for the New England Mutual Life Insurance Company, before finding his way to vaudeville by gaining a role on Broadway in The Passing Show of 1926.

Career

Early career
His entertainment aspirations evolved from the vaudeville shows of his youth. He began his career in a vaudeville tap show, creating the act "Sanford & Bolger" with his dance partner. In 1926, he danced at New York City's legendary Palace Theatre, the premier vaudeville theatre in the United States. His limber body and improvisational dance movements won him many leading roles on Broadway in the 1930s. Eventually, his career also encompassed film, television, and nightclub work. In 1932 he was elected to the theater club, The Lambs and performed on opening night at Radio City Music Hall in December 1932.

Bolger signed his first cinema contract with MGM in 1936, and although The Wizard of Oz was early in his film career, he appeared in other movies of note. His best known pre-Oz appearance was The Great Ziegfeld (1936), in which he portrayed himself. He also appeared in Sweethearts (1938), the first MGM film in Technicolor, starring Nelson Eddy and Jeanette MacDonald. He also appeared in the Eleanor Powell vehicle Rosalie (1937), which also starred Eddy and Frank Morgan.

The Wizard of Oz 

Bolger's MGM contract stipulated that he would play any part the studio chose. However, he was unhappy when he was originally cast as the Tin Woodman in the studio's 1939 feature-film adaptation of The Wizard of Oz. The role of the Scarecrow had already been assigned to another dancing, studio-contract player, Buddy Ebsen. In time, the roles were shuffled around. Bolger's face was permanently lined by wearing the Scarecrow's makeup.

Post-Oz film career 
Following The Wizard of Oz, Bolger moved to RKO Pictures. In 1941, he was a featured act at the Paramount Theatre in New York, working with the Harry James Band. He would do tap dance routines, sometimes in a mock-challenge dance with the band's pianist, Al Lerner. On December 7, 1941, the Japanese attacked Pearl Harbor, and Bolger's performance was interrupted by President Roosevelt's announcement of the news of the attack. Bolger toured in USO shows in the Pacific Theater during World War II, and appeared in the United Artists wartime film Stage Door Canteen (1943).

In 1946, he returned to MGM for a featured role in The Harvey Girls. Also that year, he recorded a children's album, The Churkendoose, featuring the story of a misfit fowl ("part chicken, turkey, duck, and goose"), which teaches children that beauty is in the eye of the beholder and it "all depends on how you look at things".

Broadway

Bolger's Broadway credits included Life Begins at 8:40 (1934), On Your Toes (1936), By Jupiter (1942), All American (1962) and Where's Charley? (1948), for which he won the Tony Award for Best Performance by a Leading Actor in a Musical and in which he introduced "Once in Love with Amy", the song often connected with him. He repeated his stage role in the 1952 film version of the musical.

Television
Bolger appeared in his own ABC television sitcom with a variety show theme, Where's Raymond? (1953–1954), renamed the second year as The Ray Bolger Show (1954–55). He continued to star in several films, including  Walt Disney's remake of Babes in Toyland (1961) and smaller cameos throughout the 1960s and 1970.

Bolger made frequent guest appearances on television, including the episode "Rich Man, Poor Man" of the short-lived The Jean Arthur Show in 1966. In the 1970s, he had a recurring role as Fred Renfrew, the father of Shirley Partridge (Shirley Jones) on The Partridge Family, and appeared in Little House on the Prairie as Toby Noe and also guest-starred on other television series, such as Battlestar Galactica, Fantasy Island, and The Love Boat. In the late 1970s, Bolger played in a commercial for Safeway Supermarket's "Scotch Buy" brand, in which he popularized the jingle, "Scotch Buy - 'taint fancy, but it shore is good."  His last television appearance was on Diff'rent Strokes in 1984, three years before his death.

In his later years, he danced in a Dr Pepper television commercial, and in 1985, he and Liza Minnelli, the daughter of his Oz costar Judy Garland, starred in That's Dancing!, a film written by Jack Haley, Jr., the son of Jack Haley, who portrayed the Tin Woodman in The Wizard of Oz.

Honors
In 1998, a Golden Palm Star on the Palm Springs, California, Walk of Stars was dedicated to him.

In 2016, the City of Boston commissioned a mural in Ray Bolger's honor in the Codman Square section of the Dorchester neighborhood.

Personal life
Bolger was married to Gwendolyn Rickard for more than 57 years. They had no children. He was a Roman Catholic and a member of the Good Shepherd Parish and the Catholic Motion Picture Guild in Beverly Hills, California.

Bolger was a lifelong Republican who campaigned for Barry Goldwater in the 1964 United States presidential election and Richard Nixon in the 1968 election.

Bolger had 11 nieces and nephews.

Death and legacy

Bolger was diagnosed with bladder cancer in 1986, and at the end of that year, his health deteriorated and he left his Beverly Hills home to live at a nursing home in Los Angeles, where he died on January 15, 1987, five days after his 83rd birthday. He was interred at Holy Cross Cemetery, Culver City. 

At the time of his death, Bolger was the last surviving main credited cast member of The Wizard of Oz. At Judy Garland's funeral, Bolger was the only one of her Oz costars who attended. He joined Harold Arlen, the composer of "Over the Rainbow", and his wife, Anya Taranda. They were reported as among the last remaining guests at the conclusion of the service.

Whenever asked whether he had received any residuals from telecasts of The Wizard of Oz, Bolger would reply: "No, just immortality. I'll settle for that." Bolger's Scarecrow is ranked among the "most beloved movie characters of all time" by AMC and the American Film Institute.

For his contributions to the film industry, Bolger received a motion pictures star on the Hollywood Walk of Fame in 1960. It is located at 6788 Hollywood Boulevard.

In 2019, the first comprehensive biography of Bolger, More Than a Scarecrow by Holly Van Leuven, was published.

Filmography

Stage work

References

External links

 
 
 
 Churkendoose album (mp3)
 "Did these stories Really Happen" by Michelle Bernier. Createspace Pub. 2010; 

1904 births
1987 deaths
20th-century American male actors
20th-century American male singers
20th-century American singers
American male dancers
American male film actors
American male musical theatre actors
American male television actors
American people of Irish descent
American tap dancers
Burials at Holy Cross Cemetery, Culver City
California Republicans
Catholics from Massachusetts
Deaths from bladder cancer
Deaths from cancer in California
Donaldson Award winners
Eccentric dancers
Male actors from Boston
Metro-Goldwyn-Mayer contract players
Musicians from Boston
People from Dorchester, Massachusetts
People from South Boston
Tony Award winners
Vaudeville performers
Warner Bros. contract players
Decca Records artists